Beyond This Place (released in the United States as Web of Evidence) is a 1959 British crime mystery film based on the 1950 novel of the same title by A. J. Cronin. It was directed by Jack Cardiff and stars Van Johnson and Vera Miles.

Plot 
The opening credits roll over images of a father playing with his young son in a wood and sailing a toy yacht on a pond. We then jump to Liverpool during the Blitz in the Second World War. A woman (it is implied she is a prostitute) tells a man she is pregnant, then he goes home to see his wife and children. The police arrive at his door and ask what he knows of the murder of the prostitute.

The story jumps to 1959 and the man's son (Paul) is sailing back into Liverpool "to clear things up". He is shocked when a local shopkeeper tells him that Mr Oswald saved his father's life: "that is why he wasn't hanged... for the murder". He knows nothing of any of this.

He heads to the library and starts reading through old newspapers from 1941. Eventually he finds "Liverpool Girl Murdered: Man Questioned". He then finds an article linked "Man Charged". The librarian has to usher him out as the library closes.

When he eventually gets to the core of the story it appears that the police have covered the truth. But when he goes to see his father in prison at the point of release he is deeply disappointed in his character: he wants whisky and a prostitute as soon as possible. Paul says he is ashamed of him.

But Paul is determined to help him, and the film ends on a hopeful note.

Cast 

Van Johnson as Paul Mathry
Vera Miles as Lena Anderson
Emlyn Williams as Enoch Oswald
Bernard Lee as Patrick Mathry
Jean Kent as Louise Burt
Moultrie Kelsall as Chief Inspector Dale
Leo McKern as McEvoy
Ralph Truman as Sir Matthew Sprott
Geoffrey Keen as Prison Governor
Jameson Clark as Swann
Rosalie Crutchley as Ella Mathry
Oliver Johnston as Prusty
Joyce Heron as Catherine, Lady Sprott
Anthony Newlands as Dunn
Vincent Winter as Paul Mathry (as a child)
Henry Oscar as Alderman Sharpe
John Glyn-Jones as Magistrate
Hope Jackman as Mrs. Hanley
Michael Collins as Detective Sergeant Trevor
Danny Green as Roach
 Josephine Bell as Woman passing by
 Jacky Bell as Little Boy passing by

References

External links 
Web of Evidence at Turner Classic Movies
 

1959 crime films
1959 films
1950s mystery films
British black-and-white films
British crime films
British mystery films
1950s English-language films
Films based on British novels
Films based on works by A. J. Cronin
Films directed by Jack Cardiff
Films scored by Douglas Gamley
Films set in Liverpool
Films shot in England
1950s British films